József Haller (January 24, 1935 – March 2, 2017) was an ethnic Hungarian painter, illustrator and scenic designer from Satu Mare, Romania.

Career 

József Haller attended the School of Fine Arts in Cluj between 1949 and 1953 with a specialization in painting. He continued his studies at the Cluj-Napoca Academy of Arts during 1953–1959 with a specialization in sculpture under the masters Ion Irimescu, Artúr Vetró and András Kós. He was a member of the Romanian Fine Arts Union, the Barabas Miklós Guild as well as the National Association of Hungarian Artists. From 1959 until retirement, for 40 years, he was the scenic designer for the Youth and Puppet Theater Ariel, where he designed the scenery, the costumes and the puppets for more than 120 plays.

Solo exhibits 
 Târgu Mureș (1970, 1975, 1977, 1978, 1990, 1995, 2002, 2003, 2004, 2006, 2008, 2010, 2011, 2013, 2015);
 Satu Mare (1975, 1981);
 Siegen (1979);
 Cluj-Napoca (1981);
 Miercurea Ciuc (2003);
 Budapest: Újpest Gallery (2005);
 Budapest: Vármegye Gallery (2005).

International group exhibits 

 Barcelona (Spain): Juan Miro International Graphic Exhibition, 1975;
 Mannheim (Germany): Contemporary Romanian Fine Art, 1979;
 Maastricht (The Netherlands): Romanian Graphics, 1982;
 Kraków (Poland): International Biennale of Graphic Work, 1985;
 Budapest (Hungary): Exhibit of Hungarian Fine Artists from Romania, 1990, 1992, 1993, 1995;
 Washington (USA): Exhibit of Hungarian Fine Artists from Transylvania, 1990;
 Stockholm (Sweden), 1994, 1996;
 Frankfurt (Germany): „Kaddisch”, 1995;
 Debrecen, Szarvas, Nyíregyháza (Hungrary): 12 artists from Transylvania (1993);
 Budapest (Hungary), 1996;
 Kecskemét (Hungary): Contemporary Fine Arts from Tîrgu Mureș, 2000;
 Budapest (Hungary), ERNST Museum: Half-life (2002);
 Millenary tracks - 10 graphic artists from Romania: Rome, Paris, Berlin, Stockholm, Moscow, Bucharest, Budapest, 2005.

Creation camps: Iserlohn - Germany (1984, 1989, 1995, 1996, 1997, 1998, 2002, 2003), Lăzarea - Romania (1988), Cătălina – Romania (1992), Marcali - Hungary (1992), Zalaegerszeg – Hungary (1993), Bolyai creation camp in Tîrgu Mureș - Romania (2009).

Illustrations 
József Haller published a volume of illustrations under the title Arany alapra arannyal. Furthermore, he illustrated several volumes of poems from contemporary artists, such as Emese Egyed, Sándor Kányádi, András Ferenc Kovács, Béla Markó, Attila Nagy. He also frequently published illustrations on the pages of the literary magazine Igaz Szó.

Awards 
 Ordinul „23 August” (Romania, 1964);
 A Magyar Köztársasági Érdemrend kiskeresztje (Hungary, 1995);
 Diplomă de Onoare al Ministerului Culturii din România (Romania, 1995);
 Ordinul Meritul Cultural „Cavaler” al Ministerului Culturii din România (Romania, 2004);
 Several awards as puppet and scenic designer, including a Lifetime Achievement Award in 2004.

Bibliography 
Cebuc A, Florea V., Lăptoiu. N.: Enciclopedia Artiștilor Români Contemporani. Editura ARC 2000 (2001).
Banner Zoltán: Haller József. Marosvásárhely, Mentor Kiadó (2002). 
Barbosa, Octavian: Dicționarul artiștilor români contemporani, Editura Meridiane (1976).
Pepino, Cristian (coord.): Dicționarul teatrului de păpuși, marionete și animație din România, Editura Alma (2000).

References

External links 
 Works of József Haller

20th-century Romanian painters
Romanian scenic designers
20th-century Hungarian painters
People from Satu Mare
1935 births
2017 deaths
Romanian people of Hungarian descent
Hungarian male painters
20th-century Hungarian male artists